Lilian Laslandes (born 4 September 1971) is a French former professional footballer who played as a forward. Between 1997 and 1999 he was capped seven times and scored three goals for the France national team. He ended his professional footballing career at OGC Nice in 2008.

Career

Early career
Laslandes was born in Pauillac, Gironde. He started his professional career at the rather late age of 20, starting at the club Saint-Seurin in which he scored 10 goals in his 33 appearances for the club. AJ Auxerre took notice of his talent and acquired him following the season. He went on to make 125 appearances for the club, 20 of them in European competitions, scoring 47 goals including two in European cup ties.

Laslandes then moved to Girondins de Bordeaux on a free transfer on 1 August 1997 scoring 47 goals in 119 appearances. Foreign clubs were starting to take notice of the Frenchman and his consistent goalscoring ability, including some from England, Germany and Spain.

Sunderland
Laslandes arrived in June 2001, as Peter Reid's replacement for the ageing Niall Quinn. Much media hype surrounded the powerful Frenchman as the club paid £3.6m for his signature, but he struggled to adapt to the pace of the English Premiership and Sunderland's style of direct football. Laslandes' relationship with Reid had also deteriorated. After 12 appearances with no league goals and one in the League Cup against Sheffield Wednesday, Laslandes went on loan in January 2002 to German club 1. FC Köln, where he played five matches without scoring, which earned him the derogatory nickname "LasLandesliga". This was followed by a more successful loan to French first division club Bastia for the 2002–03 season, where he scored eight goals in 30 appearances.

Laslandes returned briefly to Sunderland in the summer of 2003 for pre-season training with new manager Mick McCarthy. However, all parties agreed he had no future at Sunderland. Despite chairman Bob Murray's efforts to secure a transfer fee for the former French international, Sunderland's crippling debts, combined with Laslandes' Premiership wages, put Murray in a weak bargaining position, with the result that Laslandes was released from his contract and joined French first division club OGC Nice at the start of the 2003–04 season.

Back at Bordeaux
At the beginning of the 2004–05 season, Bordeaux brought the striker back to the club where he had earlier found glory, but he never found his old form, scoring only nine goals in 53 appearances.

Back at Nice
On 5 January 2007, Laslandes signed for his former club Nice for an undisclosed fee. He was released in the summer of 2008. He then decided to retire from professional football and become a handball player for Girondins de Bordeaux instead.

Career statistics

International

France score listed first, score column indicates score after each Laslandes goal.

Honours
Auxerre
Division 1: 1995–96
Coupe de France: 1993–94, 1995–96

Bordeaux
Division 1: 1998–99
Coupe de la Ligue runner-up: 1997–98

References

External links
 
 

1971 births
Living people
Sportspeople from Gironde
French footballers
France under-21 international footballers
France international footballers
Association football forwards
FC Libourne players
AJ Auxerre players
FC Girondins de Bordeaux players
Sunderland A.F.C. players
1. FC Köln players
SC Bastia players
OGC Nice players
Ligue 2 players
Ligue 1 players
Premier League players
Bundesliga players
French expatriate footballers
Expatriate footballers in England
Expatriate footballers in Germany
French expatriate sportspeople in England
French expatriate sportspeople in Germany
Footballers from Nouvelle-Aquitaine